Do You Know the Way? is the final album by American jazz pianist Bobby Timmons recorded in 1968 and released on the Milestone label.

Reception
The Allmusic review awarded the album 3 stars.

Track listing
All compositions by Bobby Timmons except as indicated
 "The Spanish Count" - 5:52 
 "I Won't Be Back" (Joe Beck) - 5:35 
 "Last Night When We Were Young" (Harold Arlen, Yip Harburg) - 4:24 
 "Do You Know the Way to San Jose" (Burt Bacharach, Hal David) - 4:06 
 "Come Together" - 7:40 
 "Something to Live For" (Duke Ellington, Billy Strayhorn) - 4:59 
 "Soul Time" - 4:23 
 "This Guy's in Love With You" (Bacharach, David) - 3:36
Recorded in New York City in November 1968.

Personnel
Bobby Timmons - piano 
Joe Beck - guitar (tracks 2-5 & 8)
Bob Cranshaw - electric bass 
Jack DeJohnette  - drums

References

Milestone Records albums
Bobby Timmons albums
1968 albums